David Stanton Coltrane (July 27, 1893 – 1968) was an American politician who served as the eleventh North Carolina Commissioner of Agriculture.

Early life and education
Davis Stanton Coltrane was born, July 27, 1893, in Randolph County, North Carolina. He graduated from Guilford College in 1918 and received a graduate degree from North Carolina State College.

In the early 1930s Coltrane worked for the Mascot Lime Company.

Political career
In the fall of 1935, Coltrane urged William Kerr Scott to run for the office of North Carolina Commissioner of Agriculture. When Scott entered the race for Agriculture Commissioner Coltrane stopped working for the lime company and worked for Scott full-time on the campaign trail.

Agriculture Commission
Coltrane worked as an assistant to Agriculture Commissioner Scott. As assistant commissioner Coltrane worked to improve the quality of fertilizer and feed sold to North Carolina farmers. When Scott resigned to run for Governor, Coltrane was appointed by Governor R. Gregg Cherry as North Carolina Commissioner of Agriculture on February 14, 1948.

State budget officer
Coltrane continued to serve in state government later becoming a State Budget Officer for the North Carolina Department of Administration. He became special consultant to Governor Terry Sanford on economy and efficiency in government in December 1961. From 1958 to 1959, Coltrane was President of the National Association of State Budget Officers.

Good Neighbor Council
In the 1960s, Governor Sanford created the Good Neighbor Council to help ease racial tensions that were building in the state because of civil rights struggles and integration issues. Sanford established this council on January 13, 1963, and appointed Coltrane as the first Chairman and Executive Director. He held this position until his death in 1968.

Honors
 The North Carolina Human Relations Commission awards the David S. Coltrane Award in his memory.
 Coltrane Hall on the campus of North Carolina Agricultural and Technical State University is named after him, as well as Coltrane Hall on the campus of Appalachian State University in Boone, North Carolina.

References

1893 births
North Carolina Commissioners of Agriculture
People from Randolph County, North Carolina
1968 deaths
20th-century American politicians